Magtymguly District   (formerly Garrygala District) is a district of Balkan Province in Turkmenistan. The administrative center of the district is the city of Magtymguly, formerly named Garrygala.

In 2023 it was named winner of the competition for most outstanding district in Turkmenistan, earning a prize of one million dollars.

References

Districts of Turkmenistan
Balkan Region